Liudmyla Nikolaevna Semykina (23 August 1924 – 12 January 2021) was an artist and painter from Odessa, Ukraine, and an Honored Artist of Ukraine (2009). She was awarded the Taras Shevchenko National Prize of Ukraine for a series of costumes for High Castle (1997) and a winner of the Vasyl Stus Prize (2000). Semykina is known for her artworks, including many paintings, landscapes, and still life portraits of Odessa. person, respect yourself.”

Biography 
Semykina graduated from Grekov Odessa Art School in 1943 and the Kiev State Art Institute in 1953. She became a member of the Union of Artists of Ukraine in 1958. In 1964, one year after she joined the Club of Creative Youth in Kyiv, she was commissioned by the Kyiv University to paint an image. She created a stained-glass panel depicting an angry Taras Shevchenko holding a battered woman and a book. The battered woman in Semykina's work symbolized Ukraine. The painting's inscription says "I shall glorify these small dumb slaves, I shall put the word on guard beside them." This painting was later destroyed by the Communist government. Due to her public petitions and political activities she was expelled from the Union of Artists of the Ukrainian SSR in 1968. From 1968 to 1988 Semykina designed traditional Ukrainian outfits. Some of which came to be used in films such as Zakhar Berkut. In the year 1988 she rejoined the Union of Artists. Semykina believed that the Krushschev Thaw, which was a period of de-stalinization in the Soviet Union, was about a central message of "You are a person, respect yourself."

Artwork 

 Group Portrait of the Old Bolshevik Arsenals (1954).
 In the port of Odessa.
 Winter Evening
 Twilight "After the round" (1954).
 Windy Day (1957).
 Repair of the berth (1960).
 Mornings (1961).
 The Legend of Kyiv  (1966).
 Stained glass window "Taras Shevchenko at the University of Kiev" (co-authored, destroyed in May 1964).
 Sketches of costumes for the film "Zahar Berkut" (1970-1971).
 Design of Pochayna metro station (1980)

Literature 

 Taras Shevchenko at the University of Kiev (co-authored, destroyed in May 1964).
 Sketches of costumes for the film Zahar Berkut (1970–1971).
 Encyclopedia of Ukrainian Studies (Ukr.) / V. Kubiyovych - Paris; New York
 Young Life, 1954–1989. Art of Ukraine: Biographical Handbook, edited by AV Kudrytsky, MG Labinsky. 
 Ukrainian Encyclopedia, 1997. pp. 531–532 - .

Buildings 

 Scythian steppe
 Polish legend
 Princely era
 Retro
 Modern (1965–1996).
 Design of Pochayna metro station (1980)

References 

1924 births
2021 deaths
Ukrainian women painters
20th-century Ukrainian painters